Andres "Andy" Cavazos (born January 5, 1981) is a former Major League Baseball pitcher. He made his major league debut for the St. Louis Cardinals on June 7, 2007, against the Cincinnati Reds.

He was released by the Cardinals on November 20, 2007. On January 7, 2008, he signed a minor league deal with the New York Mets, but was released during spring training. He signed with the Chicago Cubs two weeks later, but was released in late June.  He played in the Mexican Triple-A League for the Quintana Roo Tigres in 2008.

Cavazos is related to retired professional wrestler Tito Santana.

External links

Fan Forum

1981 births
Living people
People from Freeport, Texas
Baseball players from Texas
Major League Baseball pitchers
St. Louis Cardinals players
Memphis Redbirds players
Iowa Cubs players
Bridgeport Bluefish players
Tigres de Quintana Roo players
American expatriate baseball people in Mexico